Ashley Zhao was a five-year-old girl who was discovered dead in her family's restaurant in Jackson Township, Stark County, Ohio, U.S.A., on January 10, 2017. Her death sparked an investigation lead by the local police department in cooperation with the Ohio Bureau of Criminal Investigation and the Federal Bureau of Investigation.

Ming Ming Chen, Ashley's mother, was charged with her death and convicted of involuntary manslaughter. Ashley's father, Liang Zhao, was also tried and found guilty of obstructing justice and corpse abuse for assisting Chen in hiding the body. Chen and Zhao were sentenced to 22 and 12 years in prison respectively.

Missing persons report & discovery of a body 
On January 9, 2017, Ashley Zhao disappeared from Ang's Asian Cuisine, a restaurant owned by her parents. She was reported missing on the same day at around 9:00 PM. Her parents told the police that she may have “wandered out a back door”. On the morning of January 10, authorities issued a Statewide Endangered Child Alert for her. While searching the restaurant, police found her body “concealed” in the kitchen, close to the freezer.

Investigation & legal proceedings 
Chen and Zhao were arrested for their daughter's death on 11 January; at the Massillon Municipal Court, their bonds were set at $5 million each because the judge believed that they posed a flight risk. Although her parents had reported her missing, the police believed that Chen had repeatedly punched Ashley in the face until she died.

Ming Ming Chen 
Charged with murder and felonious assault, Ming Ming Chen taped a video with the police in which she confessed to beating Ashley to death. She talked about how she was exhausted by working at the restaurant and that Ashley had become disobedient. After informing her husband that Ashley was dead, she tasked him with hiding the body. During a hearing on October 12, 2017, Chen pleaded not guilty to the murder charge by reason of insanity.

On December 29, 2017, after she pleaded guilty to involuntary manslaughter, she was sentenced to 22 years in prison. As she had come to the United States illegally when she was a teenager, she will be deported back to China after being released from prison.

Liang Zhao 
As part of a plea deal, Zhao, a U.S. Citizen, agreed to testify against Ming Ming Chen in exchange for a sentence of 12 years in prison.

According to Zhao, when he found Ashley, she was lying on the floor with head injuries (that Chen presumably inflicted) and “green fluid” coming out of her mouth. He took her to the bathroom to clean the fluid off her face; by that point she had stopped breathing. He tried to perform CPR, but did not successfully revive her. He also confessed to helping Chen hide Ashley's body in the restaurant following her death.

On September 11, 2017, he pleaded guilty to two counts of child endangerment, corpse abuse, obstruction of justice, and evidence tampering.

He was sentenced to 12 years in prison on January 10, 2018.

References 

2010s crimes in Ohio
January 2017 crimes in North America